Fascination is an erotic thriller graphic adventure game developed by Tomahawk and published by Coktel Vision for the Amiga, Atari ST, and MS-DOS in 1991.

Gameplay
Fascination is a first person point and click game, the player picks up objects or interacts with the environment (activating or moving objects) using the mouse cursor. The player advances the plot by solving puzzles.

Plot
The protagonist is a flight stewardess. A passenger who died on the last flight gave her a suitcase containing a capsule containing a secret substance. That secret capsule gets her involved in a murder mystery.

Reception
Fascination received mixed reviews reception upon its release, including some very positive review scores of upwards of 90% for the PC version in French magazines; the Amiga reviews ranging from a high 80% in CU Amiga, through moderate 67% and 65% in Amiga Power and Amiga Format, to only 51% and 47% in Amiga Action and Amiga Computing. Retrospectively, Richard Cobbett of PC Gamer opined the game has had "perhaps the stupidest ending of any game in history." 

Polish scholar Filip Jankowski criticized Cobbett’s opinion, remarking that Fascination’s ending predicted the finale of David Fincher’s film The Game (1997). Compared to Fincher’s film, Fascination more evidently criticizes capitalism. Jankowski stated that in the game’s ending, all game characters turn out to participate in a murder party, the majority of them belonging to the white male establishment responsible for the pornographic content of the game world. Thus, leaving the area of the murder party, Doralice questions the patriarchal norms. Jankowski also stressed that Fascination was among the first video games featuring the female protagonist and  adopting her viewpoint.

References

External links

1991 video games
Amiga games
Atari ST games
DOS games
Erotic video games
LGBT-related video games
First-person adventure games
ScummVM-supported games
Single-player video games
Coktel Vision games
Video games developed in France
Video games featuring female protagonists
Video games set in Miami
Video games scored by Frédéric Motte